Paul Wild is a former professional rugby league footballer who played in the 1980s. He played at club level for Featherstone Rovers (Heritage № 633).

Club career
Paul Wild made his début for Featherstone Rovers on Sunday 9 November 1986.

References

Featherstone Rovers players
Place of birth missing
English rugby league players
Year of birth missing